Delhivery (stylized as DELHIVErY) is an Indian logistics and supply chain company, based in Gurugram. It was founded in 2011 by Sahil Barua, Mohit Tandon, Bhavesh Manglani, Suraj Saharan, and Kapil Bharati. The company has over 85 fulfillment centers, 24 automated sort centers, 70 hubs, 7,500+ partner centers, and 3,000+ direct delivery centers, as of 2021. About two-thirds of its revenue comes from providing third-party logistics and delivery services to e-commerce companies.

History 
Delhivery was established in May 2011 as SSN Logistics Ltd. It was initially conceptualised as a hyperlocal express delivery service provider for offline stores, delivering flowers and food locally in the city of Gurugram for the first few months since its inception. During that time, the online retailing and e-commerce segment was expanding rapidly in India, with global investors showing significant interest in the industry.

Founders Barua and Tandon, who were at the time working as consultants with the management consulting firm, Bain & Company, were intrigued by the size and potential of the industry, and decided to focus on the segment. In June 2011, Delhivery signed its first e-commerce client, Urban Touch, which is an online fashion and beauty retailer. By August 2011, Delhivery had switched completely to offering logistics services to a number of e-commerce companies.

In March 2019, Delhivery raised its biggest round of funding with a $413 million investment from SoftBank. In May 2021, Delhivery revealed it has further raised $277 million in a funding round led by Fidelity, taking its market valuation to nearly $3 billion.

In December 2021, it acquired California-based unmanned aircraft system company Transition Robotics Inc.

Delhivery raised  of funding from 64 anchor investors ahead of its initial public offering in May 2022.

Organization 
Founder Sahil Barua is the CEO of Delhivery and Co-Founder Kapil Bharati is the CTO of Delhivery. Sandeep Barasia, Managing Director was appointed as the Chief Business Officer in December 2018. He is in charge of the P&L across the parcel, warehousing, and freight divisions. At the same time, Ajith Pai, who was the CFO, took over the role of COO where he is in charge of the operations, engineering, HR, and finance of the company. Meanwhile, IIT-Kanpur alumnus Amit Agarwal, who was earlier the vice president-finance at Delhivery, took over the role of CFO. The company witnessed the exit of two founders on 30 March 2021.

Investors
As of November 2021, the largest stakeholders in the company are SoftBank Group (22.78%) and Nexus Venture Partners (9.23%). Other investors with over 5% stake include The Carlyle Group, CPP Investment Board, Tiger Global, and Times Internet. Delhivery has raised about 1.4 billion from its investors across 13 private fundraising rounds until December 2021.

Awards 

 ET Startup of the Year Award 2019
Mahindra Transport Excellence Award 2018
Young Turk Start-up of the Year 2016

References

External links 
 The intellectual courier, a feature in Mint on Delhivery co-founder and CEO Sahil Barua.

Logistics companies of India
E-commerce in India
Indian companies established in 2011
Indian brands
2011 establishments in Delhi
Companies based in Gurgaon